The Hekhalot literature (sometimes transliterated Heichalot) from the Hebrew word for "Palaces", relating to visions of ascents into heavenly palaces. The genre overlaps with Merkabah or "Chariot" literature, concerning Ezekiel's chariot, so the two are sometimes referred to together as "Books of the Palaces and the Chariot". The Hekhalot literature is a genre of Jewish esoteric and revelatory texts produced some time between late antiquity – some believe from Talmudic times or earlier – to the Early Middle Ages.

Many motifs of later Kabbalah are based on the Hekhalot texts, and the Hekhalot literature itself is based upon earlier sources, including traditions about heavenly ascents of Enoch found among the Dead Sea scrolls and the Hebrew Bible pseudepigrapha. Hekhalot itself has many pseudepigraphic texts.

Texts

Some of the Hekhalot texts are:
 Hekhalot Zutartey ("Lesser Palaces" or "Palaces Minor"; Hebrew: היכלות זוטרתי), which details an ascent of Rabbi Akiva through the Heavens, seeking revelations regarding the holy name of God;
 Hekhalot Rabbati ("Greater Palaces" or "Palaces Major"; Hebrew: היכלות רבתי), or Pirkei Hekhalot, which details the ascent of Rabbi Ishmael when he sought to examine the validity of the decree regarding the execution of the Ten Martyrs;
 Maaseh Merkabah ("Account of the Chariot"), a collection of hymns recited by the "descenders" into the holy chariot, and heard during their ascent;
 Merkavah Rabba ("The greater Chariot"):
 Sepher Hekhalot ("Book of Palaces," also known as 3 Enoch)

Other similar texts are:
 Re'uyyot Yehezqel ("The Visions of Ezekiel")
 Massekhet Hekhalot ("The Tractate of the Palaces")
 Shi'ur Qomah ("Divine Dimensions")
 Sepher Ha-Razim ("Book of the Mysteries")
 Harba de Moshe ("The Sword of Moses")
 Alphabet of Akiba ben Joseph

Dating and genre
The Hekhalot literature is post-rabbinical, and not a literature of the rabbis, but since it seeks to stand in continuity with the Rabbinic literature often pseudepigraphical.

Hekhalot has examples of early alternate history texts.

See also 
 Merkabah mysticism
 Primary texts of Kabbalah
 Seven Heavens
 Smaller midrashim
 Mystical ascent in Midrash Eleh Ezkerah
 Ten Martyrs

References

External links 
 The Zoharic Seven Heavens
 The Heichalot & the Merkavah, (The Palaces & The Chariot)
 Notes on the Study of Merkabah Mysticism and Hekhalot Literature in English
 English translation of the Hekhalot Rabbati

Jewish mystical texts
Merkabah mysticism